The 2002 FIA GT Magny-Cours 500 km was the opening round the 2002 FIA GT Championship season.  It took place at the Circuit de Nevers Magny-Cours, France, on 21 April 2002.

Official results
Class winners in bold.  Cars failing to complete 70% of winner's distance marked as Not Classified (NC).

† – #54 Freisinger Motorsport was disqualified after failing post-race technical inspection.  The car was found to have a fuel tank larger than the rules allowed.

Statistics
 Pole position – #14 Lister Storm Racing – 1:33.974
 Fastest lap – #14 Lister Storm Racing – 1:35.313
 Average speed – 152.694 km/h

References

 
 
 

M
FIA GT
FIA GT Magny-Cours 500km